Song Qingling (born 22 July 1986 in Liaoning Province) is a field hockey player from China. She won a silver medal with the national women's hockey team at the 2008 Summer Olympics in Beijing.

She won a silver medal as a member of the Chinese team at 2014 Asian Games.

References

External links
 

1986 births
Living people
Chinese female field hockey players
Asian Games gold medalists for China
Asian Games medalists in field hockey
Asian Games silver medalists for China
Field hockey players at the 2008 Summer Olympics
Field hockey players at the 2010 Asian Games
Field hockey players at the 2012 Summer Olympics
Field hockey players at the 2014 Asian Games
Field hockey players at the 2016 Summer Olympics
Medalists at the 2008 Summer Olympics
Medalists at the 2010 Asian Games
Medalists at the 2014 Asian Games
Olympic field hockey players of China
Olympic silver medalists for China
People from Zhuanghe
Sportspeople from Dalian
Olympic medalists in field hockey